Moubani Sorcar (born Purbita Sorcar on 21 October 1987) is an Indian actress and painter. She is daughter of magician P. C. Sorcar Jr.

She made her acting debut opposite Prosenjit Chatterjee with Anup Sengupta's Bengali film Badla (2009).

Filmography

References

External links
 

Living people
Bengali actresses
Actresses from Kolkata
Sorcar family
1987 births